The Antonov An-24 (Russian/Ukrainian: Антонов Ан-24) (NATO reporting name: Coke) is a 44-seat twin turboprop transport/passenger aircraft designed in 1957 in the Soviet Union by the Antonov Design Bureau and manufactured by Kyiv, Irkutsk and Ulan-Ude Aviation Factories.

Design and development

First flown in 1959, the An-24 was produced in some 1,000 units of various versions; in 2019 there are 109 still in service worldwide, mostly in the CIS and Africa.

It was designed to replace the veteran piston Ilyushin Il-14 transport on short to medium haul trips, optimised for operating from rough strips and unprepared airports in remote locations. The high-wing layout protects engines and blades from debris, the power-to-weight ratio is higher than that of many comparable aircraft and the machine is rugged, requiring minimal ground support equipment.

Due to its rugged airframe and good performance, the An-24 was adapted to perform many secondary missions such as ice reconnaissance and engine/propeller test-bed, as well as further development to produce the An-26 tactical transport, An-30 photo-mapping/survey aircraft and An-32 tactical transport with more powerful engines. Various projects were envisaged such as a four jet short/medium haul airliner and various iterations of powerplant.

The main production line was at the Kyiv-Svyatoshino (later renamed "Aviant") aircraft production plant which built 985, with 180 built at Ulan Ude and a further 197 An-24T tactical transport/freighters at Irkutsk. Production in the USSR was shut down by 1978.

Production continues at China's Xi'an Aircraft Industrial Corporation which makes licensed, reverse-engineered and redesigned aircraft as the Xian Y-7, and its derivatives. Manufacture of the Y-7, in civil form, has now been supplanted by the MA60 derivative with western engines and avionics, to improve performance and economy, and widen the export appeal.

Total production

Variants

An-24
 Designation for prototypes. Four built.
An-24A
 (first use) Proposed production version powered by Kuznetsov NK-4 turboprops, discontinued when the NK-4 was cancelled.
An-24A
 (second use) Production 50-seat airliners built at Kyiv with the APU exhaust moved to the tip of the starboard nacelle.
An-24ALK (Avtomatizeerovannaya [sistema] Lyotnovo Kontrolya – automatic flight check system)
 Several An-24s were converted for navaids calibration tasks, with one An-24LR 'Toros' re-designated An-24ALK after conversion. This aircraft was fitted with a photo-theodolite and powerful light sources for the optical sensors.
An-24AT
 A 1962 project for a Tactical transport with rear loading ramp and powered by Isotov TV2-117DS coupled turboprops.
An-24AT-RD (RD – Reaktivnyye Dvigateli – jet engines)
 The An-24AT tactical transport project with two turbojet boosters pod-mounted under the outer wings and a wider loading ramp.
An-24AT-U (Uskoriteli – boosters)
 A projected Tactical transport from 1966 with three or five PRD-63 (Porokhovoy Raketnyy Dvigatel – gunpowder rocket engine) JATO bottles, wider cargo ramp and provision for up to three brake parachutes.
An-24B
 The second 50-seat airliner version with one extra window each side, single-slotted flaps replacing the double-slotted flaps and extended chord of the centre-section to compensate for the lower performance flaps. Some aircraft were delivered with four extra fuel bladders in the wing centre-section.
An-24D
 A projected long-range airliner version of the An-24B with a single RU-19 booster jet engine in the starboard nacelle, stretched fuselage with seating for 60, strengthened structure and increased fuel capacity.
An-24LL (Letyushchaya Laboratoriya – flying laboratory)
 The generic suffix LL can be applied to any test-bed, but in the An-24's case seems to refer to a single aircraft equipped for metrology (science of measurement), to be used for checking the airworthiness of production aircraft.
An-24LP (LesoPozharnyy – forest fire fighter)
 Three An-24RV aircraft converted into fire bombers/cloud seeders by installing a tank in the cabin, optical smoke and flame detectors, provision for a thermal imager, racks for carrying flare dispensers and the ability to carry firefighters for para-dropping.
An-24LR 'Toros' (Ice Hummock)(Ledovyy Razvedchik – ice reconnaissance)
 At least two An-24Bs converted to carry the 'Toros' SLAR (sideways looking airborne radar) either side of the lower fuselage, for ice reconnaissance, guiding icebreakers, convoys and other shipping.
An-24LR 'Nit' (Thread)
 One An-24B was converted to with 'Nit' SLAR in large pods along the lower fuselage sides.
An-24PRT (Poiskovo-spasahtel'nyy Reaktivnyy [Uskoritel'] Transportnyy – SAR boosted transport)
 The production search and rescue aircraft based on the An-24RT, eleven built.
An-24PS (Poiskovo-Spasahtel'nyy – SAR)
 A single An-24B aircraft converted for search and rescue duties, rejected after acceptance trials in favour of a derivative of the An-24RT.
An-24RR ([samolyot] Radiotsionnyy Razvedchik – radiation reconnaissance [aircraft])
 Four aircraft converted as Nuclear, biological and chemical warfare reconnaissance versions of the An-24B, carrying RR8311-100 air sampling pods low on the forward fuselage and a sensor pod on a pylon on the port fuselage side.
An-24RT (Reaktivnyy [Uskoritel'] Transportnyy – boosted transport)
 Similar to the AN-24T, fitted with an auxiliary turbojet engine.
An-24RT (Retranslyator – relay installation)
 A few An-24T and An-24RT aircraft converted to Communications relay aircraft. Sometimes referred to as An-24Rt to differentiate from the An-24RT.

An-24RV (Reaktivnyy [Uskoritel'] V – boosted V)
Turbojet boosted export version, similar to the An-24V but fitted with a 1,985-lb (8830 N) thrust auxiliary turbojet engine in the starboard nacelle.
An-24ShT (Shtabnoy Transportnyy – Staff/HQ transport)
 A tactical Airborne Command Post for use by commanders, also capable of forming ground-based communications and HQ.
An-24T (Transportnyy – transport)
 (first use) Tactical transport version, rejected due to poor field performance and range, together with inability to load or air-drop vehicles during acceptance testing.
An-24T (Transportnyy – transport)
 (second use) A tactical transport version with a ventral loading hatch, cargo winch and escape hatch aft of the nose landing gear.
An-24T 'Troyanda' (Ukrainian – rose)
 From the 1960s the Soviet Union was faced with nuclear submarine threats that were virtually undetectable with the technology available. To assist in the development of advanced optical, chemical, sonic, infra-red and electromagnetic detection systems, several aircraft were built or modified as test-beds. One significant aircraft was the An-24T 'Troyanda' which was built new, for the development of sonobuoy and infra-red detection systems. As well as equipment inside the cabin, sensors could be mounted in large teardrop fairings either side of the lower forward fuselage, and extra equipment could be carried in extended wing centre-section fairings.
An-24TV (Transportnyy V – transport V)
The export cargo version of the An-24T.
An-24USh (Uchebno-Shturmanskiy (samolyot) – Navigator training aircraft)
 Seven An-24Bs were converted to An-24USh navigator/air traffic controller trainers with five training stations and four standard rows of seats for trainees in waiting. Outwardly the USh was distinguishable by the bulged windows at each training station.
An-24V-I
 The initial export version of the An-24B 50-seat airliner with the early narrow chord inner wings, double-slotted flaps, single ventral fin.
An-24V-II
 Export late production 50-seat mixed passenger, cargo and freight aircraft with extended chord inner wing, single-slotted flaps, twin ventral fins and powered by AI-24T(SrsII) engines.
An-26
 Tactical transport with cargo ramp.
An-30
 Survey/Photo-mapping aircraft.
An-32
 Designed to withstand adverse weather conditions better than the standard An-26.
An-34
 The initial designation of the An-24T production tactical transport, discarded shortly after production began.
An-44
 Projected cargo aircraft developed from the An-24. Ice reconnaissance and transport versions were also planned.
An-50
 A mid-1960s project for a jet-powered An-24, with four Ivchenko AI-25 turbofan engines in podded pairs, pylon mounted forward of the wings. Not proceeded with due to competition from the Yak-40.
Xian Y-7
 The Y-7 is a Chinese reverse-engineered version of the An-24/An-26 family.
MA60
Upgraded and Westernised Y-7.
An-24
In the early 1990s, North Korea installed N-019 Topaz pulse-Doppler radars on at least one of its An-24 aircraft in an attempt to achieve a rudimentary Airborne Early Warning capability.

Operators

Military operators

  Korean People's Army Air Force - 1 (converted to a rudimentary airborne early warning aircraft)
 
 Russian Air Force
 Russian Naval Aviation
 
 Ukrainian Air Force
 Ukrainian Naval Aviation

Former military operators

Civil operators
As of July 2018, 86 An-24s were in airline service.

Following fatal incidents in July 2011 Russian President (now Prime Minister) Dmitry Medvedev proposed the accelerated decommissioning of An-24s, which resulted in a ban for this type from scheduled flights inside Russia.

 Motor Sich Airlines (3)

 Air Moldova (6) Used on flights to CIS And as charter aircraft

Former civil operators
Civil operators have included:

Accidents

Specifications (An-24B)

See also

Notes

References

Citations

Bibliography

 
 
 
 
 .

External links
 Airliners.net

An-024
Antonov An-024
Antonov An-024
High-wing aircraft
Twin-turboprop tractor aircraft
Aircraft first flown in 1959